Raymond Galle (1913–2003) was a French stage and film actor.

Selected filmography
 His Highness Love (1931)
 The Dream (1931)
 Bad Seed (1934)
 Student's Hotel (1932)
 The Lie of Nina Petrovna (1937)
 Latin Quarter (1939)
 Angelica (1939)
 The Last Metro (1945)
 A Hole in the Wall (1950)
 Great Man (1951)

References

Bibliography
 Klossner, Michael. The Europe of 1500-1815 on Film and Television: A Worldwide Filmography of Over 2550 Works, 1895 Through 2000. McFarland & Company, 2002.

External links

1913 births
2003 deaths
French male film actors
French male stage actors